Rubikiai is a village located close to the Lake Rubikiai, Anykščiai district municipality, Lithuania. It is known for a narrow gauge railroad line that is now protected by the state.

Villages in Utena County